Camera Can't Lie EP is the second album release from the indie rock band Camera Can't Lie. It was produced by Grammy Award-winning record producer Stephen Short in 2007.  A track from the EP, titled "Losing You", was featured on the soundtrack for the 2008 independent mystery film, The Other Side of the Tracks.

Track listing 
 "Risk" - 3:45
 "Science" - 4:18
 "Losing You" - 3:37
 "Don't Back Down" - 3:30
 "Before We Meet" - 4:48

References 

Camera Can't Lie albums
2007 EPs